The Sikorsky CH-37 Mojave (company designation S-56) is an American large heavy-lift helicopter of the 1950s.

Design and development
The S-56 came into being as an assault transport for the United States Marine Corps (USMC), with a capacity of 26 fully equipped Marines.  An order for the aircraft was placed in 1951 using the U.S. Navy/U.S. Marine Corps designation of the time of HR2S.  The first prototype, the XHR2S-1 flew in 1953 and production deliveries of the HR2S-1 began in July 1956 to Marine Helicopter Squadron One (HMX-1), with a total of sixty aircraft being produced.

The United States Army evaluated the prototype in 1954 and ordered 94 examples as the CH-37A, the first being delivered in summer 1956. All Marine Corps and Army examples were delivered by mid-1960. Army examples were all upgraded to CH-37B status in the early 1960s, being given Lear auto-stabilization equipment and the ability to load and unload while hovering. In the 1962 unification of United States military aircraft designations, the USMC examples were redesignated from HR2S-1 to CH-37C.

At the time of delivery, the CH-37 was the largest helicopter in the Western world and it was Sikorsky's first twin-engine helicopter. Two Pratt & Whitney R-2800 Double Wasp radial engines were mounted in outboard pods that also contained the retractable landing gear. This left the fuselage free for cargo, which could be loaded and unloaded through large clamshell doors in the nose. The early models could carry a payload of either three M422 Mighty Mites (a lightweight jeep-like vehicle) or 26 troops. For storage, the main rotor blades folded back on the fuselage and the tail rotor mast folded forward on the fuselage.

The CH-37 was one of the last heavy helicopters to use piston engines, which were larger, heavier and less powerful than the turboshaft engines subsequently employed in later military helicopters. This accounted for the type's fairly short service life, all being withdrawn from service by the late 1960s, replaced in Army service by the distantly related CH-54 Tarhe and in the Marine Corps by the CH-53 Sea Stallion.

Four CH-37Bs were deployed to Vietnam in September 1965 to assist in the recovery of downed U.S. aircraft, serving in this role from Marble Mountain Air Facility until May 1967. They were very successful at this role, recovering over US$7.5 million worth of equipment, some of which was retrieved from behind enemy lines. The CH-37 was also used to recover film capsules descending from space by parachute.

Variants

XHR2S-1
Prototype Assault Transport for the US Marine Corps, powered by two  R-2800-54 engines, four built.
HR2S-1
Production model for USMC with modified engine nacelles, twin mainwheels and dorsal fin, redesignated CH-37C in 1962, 55 built (order for additional 36 cancelled).
HR2S-1W
Airborne early warning aircraft for the US Navy, two built.
YH-37
One HR2S-1 helicopter evaluated by the US Army.
H-37A Mojave
Military transport version of the HR2S for the US Army, changes included dorsal fin and modified rotor head fairing, redesignated CH-37A in 1962, 94 built.
H-37B Mojave
All but four of the H-37As were modified with a redesigned cargo door, automatic stabilization equipment and crashproof fuel cells. Later redesignated CH-37B.
CH-37A H-37A redesignated in 1962.
CH-37B H-37B redesignated in 1962.
CH-37C HR2S-1 redesignated in 1962.
S-56 Sikorsky company designation for H-37.

Derivatives and related projects
Sikorsky S-60
 a prototype "sky-crane" with a skeletal fuselage with a crew cockpit at the front.
Westland Westminster
 Unable to get government support for licence production of the civil S-56, Westland Aircraft used the S-56 control systems, rotors and gearbox as the basis for the Westminster but used their own tubular frame and twin  Napier Eland turboshafts for power in a flying test rig. Due to vibration they changed to a six-bladed S-64 rotor. The private venture project was ended when Westland took over three British helicopter companies and their more advanced and funded projects.

Operators

United States Army
United States Marine Corps

Surviving aircraft

CH-37B (Army Ser. No. 55-644) is on display at the United States Army Aviation Museum at Fort Rucker, Alabama.
CH-37B (Army Ser. No. 58-1005) "Tired Dude" is on display at the Pima Air and Space Museum adjacent to Davis-Monthan Air Force Base in Tucson, Arizona.
CH-37B (Army Ser. No. 57-1651) is on display at the U.S. Army Transportation Museum at Fort Eustis, Virginia.
CH-37B (Army Ser. No. 58-0999) is on display at the Evergreen Aviation & Space Museum in McMinnville, Oregon.
CH-37C (BuNo 145864) is on display at the National Museum of Naval Aviation at Naval Air Station Pensacola, Florida.
CH-37B (Army Ser. No. 57-1646) is on display at the Classic Rotors Museum at the Ramona Airport, Ramona, CA.

Specifications (CH-37 Mojave)

See also

References

External links

 CH-37 Mojave US Army Aviation history fact sheet
 Information and Specs on the H-37
 Photos of CH-37's from 49th Avn Bn, CAL ARNG, and others
 HELIS.com Sikorsky S-56/H-37/HR2S Database

Aircraft first flown in 1953
1950s United States military transport aircraft
1950s United States helicopters
Military transport helicopters
H-037
Twin-engined piston helicopters
United States military helicopters